Goryachkin is a Russian masculine surname, its feminine counterpart is Goryachkina. Notable people with the surname include:

Aleksandra Goryachkina (born 1998), Russian chess player

Russian-language surnames